"Holding onto Heaven" is a song by English singer and songwriter Foxes from her debut studio album Glorious (2014). The song was released as a digital download in the United Kingdom on 4 May 2014 as the album's third single.

The single was the free song of the week on iTunes in Christmas 2013.

Music video
The video starts off with her playing with a music box. As she gets up from the table it is revealed there are two different versions of the same party: One of them being gloomy and slow and the other being uplifting and happy as everyone dances to the song. In the end it turns out to have all been an imagination, Foxes winding down the same music box from the beginning.

Track listing

Chart performance

Weekly charts

Release history

References

2014 songs
2014 singles
Foxes (singer) songs
Songs written by Toby Gad
Songs written by Foxes (singer)